Brigadier-General Yang Sung-sook was a South Korean army officer.

Yang was born in 1949/50 and attended Chonnam National University from which she graduated with a bachelor's degree in nursing science. She joined the Republic of Korea Army in 1973 as a second lieutenant.  By 2001 Yang had reached the rank of colonel.  That year she was promoted to brigadier-general upon assuming command of the Military Nursing Academy.  Yang was the first woman in South Korea to become a general officer.  Yang was quoted at the time as saying: "As the nation's first female general, I will do my best for the military and the country. I hope this promotion will encourage other female officers"

The press coverage around Yang's appointment has been used as an example of gendered news reporting: South Korean press reports complimented Yang on her skill at making kimchi soup and in applying her make-up, rather than any military expertise.  Yang retired from the military in 2004.

References 

Republic of Korea Army personnel
Female army generals
Military nurses
South Korean generals
Year of birth missing (living people)
Living people